Rodney Davies (born 18 May 1989) is an Australian international rugby union footballer who plays for the Western Force. He previously played six seasons for the Queensland Reds in the Super Rugby competition. Davies has represented Australia in both fifteen-a-side and seven-a-side rugby. He is also a former rugby league footballer.

Early life
Davies attended Ipswich Grammar School, the same school former Reds teammate Berrick Barnes attended. Davies can run 100m in 10.8 seconds. In 2006 he toured New Zealand and Fiji with the Australian Schoolboys.

As an 18-year-old, he said he preferred to play full-back in union, yet expected to play  in rugby league. In 2007, his first senior year of rugby league, Davies topped his team's try-scoring list in the Queensland Cup.

Rugby union career
In 2009 Davies commenced his rugby union career with the Queensland Reds. On 28 March 2009, he made his Super Rugby debut against the Chiefs. In July 2011, during the Super Rugby semi final, Davies became the first Red to score 3 tries in a match in Super Rugby.

Davies signed with French club Biarritz Olympique in June 2014, playing two seasons. He played for Mitsubishi DynaBoars in 2017, before joining the Western Force in 2018.

International
In October, 2010, he was in contention for a place in the Wallabies 30-man squad to tour Hong Kong and Europe. This was despite a five-month break without a match up until October, and competition from within the Wallabies squad from outside backs Drew Mitchell and Lachie Turner, James O'Connor and Kurtley Beale. On 17 July 2011, Davies made his Wallabies debut against Samoa.

Davies was selected in the  team in 2019 and made his debut at the Canada Sevens tournament in Vancouver.

References

External links
 It's Rugby stats
Reds profile

1989 births
Australian rugby league players
Australian rugby union players
Australian people of Filipino descent
Australia international rugby union players
Queensland Reds players
Rugby union wings
Rugby league wingers
Rugby league fullbacks
Living people
Biarritz Olympique players
Mitsubishi Sagamihara DynaBoars players
Australian expatriate rugby union players
Australian expatriate sportspeople in France
Australian expatriate sportspeople in Japan
Expatriate rugby union players in France
Expatriate rugby union players in Japan
Rugby union players from Queensland